Manga is the self-titled album of Turkish rock band Manga, released in December 2004 by Sony Music/GRGDN. It was reissued in 2006, with two additional tracks and a bonus DVD.

Track listing
Açılış (Intro)  – 1:18
Kapkaç (Snatching)  – 2:51
Bitti Rüya (The Dream is Over)  – 3:59
Bir Kadın Çizeceksin   – 3:59
Kal Yanımda (Stay Beside Me)(Vocal: Koray Candemir)  – 3:45
Yalan (The Lie)  – 5:27
Libido (Libido)  – 3:02
İz Bırakanlar Unutulmaz (Impressors Aren't Forgotten)(Vocal: VEGA)  – 4:10
Sakın Bana Söyleme (Don't You Tell Me Ever)  – 4:39
Dursun Zaman (Let The Time Stop) (Vocal: Göksel)  – 4:50
Mangara  – 2:27
İtildik (We've Been Pushed Away) – 3:25
Yalan 2 (The Lie #2) (Vocal: Koray Candemir) – 3:57
Kapanış (Closure)  – 1:07

 Hidden track: "Kal Yanımda 2" featuring Unknown MC after "Kapanış".

Reissue
Açılış (Intro)  – 1:18
Kandırma Kendini (Don't Fool Yourself) - 3:59
Raptiye Rap Rap - 4:14
Kapkaç (Snatching)  – 2:51
Bitti Rüya (The Dream is Over)(Guest vocal : Göksel Demirpençe)  – 3:59
Bir Kadın Çizeceksin (You'll Draw a Woman)  – 3:59
Kal Yanımda (Stay Beside Me)(Guest vocal: Koray Candemir)  – 3:45
Yalan (The Lie)  – 5:27
Libido (Libido)  – 3:02
İz Bırakanlar Unutulmaz (Impressors Aren't Forgotten)(Guest vocal: Vega)  – 4:10
Sakın Bana Söyleme (Don't you Tell Me)  – 4:39
Dursun Zaman (Let the Time Stop) (Guest vocal: Göksel)  – 4:50
Mangara  – 2:27
İtildik (We've Been Pushed Away) – 3:25
Yalan 2 (The Lie #2) (Backing vocal: Koray Candemir) – 3:57
Kapanış (Closure)  – 1:07

 Hidden track: "Kal Yanımda 2" featuring Evren Ozdemir after "Kapanış".

Extras

The album contains the audio cd with the above track listing, and a special DVD, containing the four music videos of the band with a specially designed manga-style DVD-menu:

 Bir Kadın Çizeceksin (director: Cynosure)
 Bitti Rüya (director: Devrin Usta)
 Dursun Zaman (director: Onur Uysal)
 Kandırma Kendini (director: Devrin Usta)

Album information

Personnel

 Management: Hadi Elazzi, Selim Serezli
 Producer: Haluk Kurosman
 Assistant Producer: Yağmur Sarıgül
 Arrangement: Haluk Kurosman and maNga
 Studio: GRGDN - ULUS
 Editing, Mixing, Mastering: Haluk Kurosman
 Design:
 Manga drawings: Kaan Demirçelik
 Graphics: Emrah Gündüz, Gümrah Oymak, Atalay Açık
 Photography: Şafak Taner

Featuring Musicians

 Keyboard, Underworks: Haluk Kurosman
 Vocal, Kal Yanımda and Yalan 2: Koray Candemir
 Vocal, İz Bırakanlar Unutulmaz: Deniz Özbey Akyüz (Vega)
 Vocal, Dursun Zaman: Göksel
 Vocal, Kal Yanımda 2: Unknown MC
 Ney in Açılış, Kapanış: Ali Sarıgül
 Piano in Yalan, İtildik: Özgür Sarı
 Sound Recording for Kapkaç, Yalan: Emel Çölgeçen

Bitti Rüya, Bir Kadın Çizeceksin, Sakın Bana Söyleme:

 Tülay Karşın: Violin
 Kerem Berkalp: Violin
 Göknil Özkök Genç: Viola
 Didem Erken: Cello

Music videos

 Bir Kadın Çizeceksin
 the song was included in the soundtrack of FIFA 06 video games by EA Sports.
 Bitti Rüya
 Dursun Zaman
 the song is featured in the soundtrack of the film Sınav (The Exam) (starring Jean-Claude Van Damme)
 Kandırma Kendini 
 This is a special video, because the song is not to be found on the album itself. It is featured as one of the two bonus songs of the re-release of the album, titled maNga+ .
 KapKaç
 The video was made by Emre Yıldız. He is the youngest art director in Turkey. The video concept is constructed around the theme of war and its effects. Although recognised by the band, and supported on the official website, the video is not aired on television.
 Yalan

External links
 maNga official site (TR) (EN)
 maNga international fanclub
 Song lyrics in English
 GRGDN official site
 

2004 albums
Albums produced by Haluk Kurosman
Manga (band) albums